The Mosby Creek Bridge, also called the Layng Bridge, is a historic Howe truss covered bridge located near Cottage Grove, Oregon, United States. The bridge crosses Mosby Creek and was constructed in 1920, making it the oldest covered bridge in Lane County.

The Mosby Creek Bridge was built in 1920 for a cost of $4125 (US$ in ) by Walter and Miller Sorensen. The bridge was named after the pioneer David Mosby. He settled east of present-day Cottage Grove near the current site of the bridge on a  land claim.

Unique design elements of the Mosby Creek Bridge include semi-circular portal arches (the entrances to the bridge), ribbon openings at the roofline, and board-and-batten siding, as well as modifications to the basic Howe truss design. In 1990, the bridge underwent a major restoration. In 2002, the corrugated metal roof that capped the bridge's gable roof was replaced with synthetic material, as well as other repairs.

In 1979, the bridge was added to the National Register of Historic Places. The Mosby Creek Bridge remains open to traffic, the only bridge in the area that does so. The Mosby Creek Bridge receives regular maintenance from the county.

See also
 List of bridges on the National Register of Historic Places in Oregon
 List of Oregon covered bridges

References

External links
Mosby Creek Bridge nomination form

Bridges completed in 1920
National Register of Historic Places in Lane County, Oregon
Covered bridges in Lane County, Oregon
Covered bridges on the National Register of Historic Places in Oregon
1920 establishments in Oregon
Road bridges on the National Register of Historic Places in Oregon
Wooden bridges in Oregon
Howe truss bridges in the United States